New York's 48th State Assembly district is one of the 150 districts in the New York State Assembly. It has been represented by Democrat Simcha Eichenstein since 2019.

Geography
District 48 is in Brooklyn. It covers the community of Borough Park and portions of Midwood in Brooklyn.

Recent election results

2022

2020

2018

2016

2014

2012

2010

References 

Politics of Brooklyn
48